Jan Jerzy Kułakowski (25 August 1930 – 25 June 2011) was a Polish politician and Member of the European Parliament for the Greater Poland Voivodship (2004–2009) with the Freedom Union, part of the Alliance of Liberals and Democrats for Europe and sat on the European Parliament's Committee on Employment and Social Affairs.

Kułakowski was a substitute for the Committee on Development, a member of the Delegation to the ACP-EU Joint Parliamentary Assembly and a substitute for the Delegation for relations with the countries of the Andean Community.

Kulakowski was a Member of the National Council of the European Integration, Advisory Group appointed by President Aleksander Kwasniewski. He was a member of the Royal Institute of International Affairs in Belgium. He was the Vice-President of Association France-Pologne pour l’ Europe and the Polish Council of the European Movement.

Education 
 1953: Doctor of Law, Catholic University of Leuven
 Work in radio (1953–54), Paris

Career 
 1954–1957: Member of the General Secretariat of the International Federation of Christian Trade Unions
 1974–1976: Secretary, General Secretary of the European Organisation of the International Federation of Christian Trade Unions
 Secretary of the European Trade Union Confederation
 1976–1989: General Secretary, World Confederation of Labour
 1990–1996: Ambassador extraordinary and plenipotentiary of the Republic of Poland, head of the Polish mission to the European Community
 1998–2001: secretary of state in the Chancellery of the Prime Minister, government plenipotentiary for Poland's accession negotiations to the European Union
 Vice-Chairman of the Programme Board of the Polish Robert Schuman Foundation (since 1996)
 since 2004: Vice-Chairman of the Polish Council of the European Movement
 since 2003: Chairman of the Public Diplomacy Council
 since 2002: Vice-Chairman of the Franco-Polish Association for Europe
 Member of the National Council for European Integration, member of the Research Group to the President of the Polish Republic
 2004–2009: Member of the European Parliament.

Honours and awards
Knight of the Order of the White Eagle (2002)
Commander with Star of the Order of Polonia Restituta
Grand Officer of the Order of Leopold II of Belgium
Legion of Honour (France – January 19, 2007)
Grand Officer of the Order of Merit of the Republic of Poland
Official Patron of the International European School in Warsaw (2012)

In 2001, Kulakowski won the Kisiel Prize. He was a member of the Royal Institute of International Relations in Belgium.

Author and co-author of numerous reports, documents, articles and essays devoted to world’s trade union movement and issues resulting in bilateral relations of Poland and the European Union.

Jan Kulakowski was married to Zofia Kulakowska-Wajs. They had three daughters.

See also
2004 European Parliament election in Poland

External links
 
 
 

1930 births
2011 deaths
People from Myszków
Commanders with Star of the Order of Polonia Restituta
Grand Officers of the Order of Leopold II
Recipients of the Legion of Honour
Democratic Party – demokraci.pl politicians
Freedom Union (Poland) MEPs
MEPs for Poland 2004–2009
Recipients of the Order of the White Eagle (Poland)